Two vessels of the Royal Navy have been named HMS Sparkler:

  was  launched at Rotherhithe in April 1797 and sold in September 1802. She then became a merchantman that a French privateer captured and that the Royal Navy recaptured. She was wrecked in 1814.
  was launched at Brightlingsea in August 1804 and wrecked on the Dutch coast in January 1808.

See also
 , a Royal Fleet Auxiliary tugboat built during World War II and sold in 1957.

Citations

Royal Navy ship names